Judges who served on the Supreme Court of Christmas Island are:

References

Supreme Court of Christmas Island